Geert is a Dutch given name of Germanic origin, equivalent to the German Gerd and the English Gerry. The name is a condensed form of Gerard, itself a combination of the Germanic words ger (spear) and hard (strong or brave) meaning "strong" or "brave with the spear". The name's common female equivalent is Geertje.

Although Geert is a name in its own right, it is often the given name of persons who are formally called Gerard or Gerardus. The latter name refers usually to saints Gerard of Toul or Gerard Majella.

People with the given name
Geert Bakker (1921–1993), Dutch sailor
Geert Egberts Boer (1832–1904), American college president
Geert Adriaans Boomgaard (1788–1899), Dutch supercentenarian
Geert Bourgeois (born 1951), Belgian politician
Geert Broeckaert (born 1960), Belgian football player 
Geert Brusselers (born 1970), Dutch football player
Geert Chatrou (born 1969), Dutch musician
Geert Cirkel (born 1978), Dutch rower 
Geert den Ouden (born 1976), Dutch football player
Geert De Vlieger (born 1971), Belgian football player
Geert De Vos (born 1981), Belgian dart player 
Geert Groote (1340–1384), Dutch preacher 
Geert Hammink (born 1969), Dutch basketball player
Geert Hofstede (born 1928), Dutch psychologist
Geert Hoste (born 1960), Belgian cabaret performer
Geert Huinink, Dutch musician
Geert Jan Jansen (born 1943), Dutch painter and art forger
Geert Lambert (born 1967), Belgian politician
Geert Lap (born 1951), Dutch ceramist
Geert Lotsij (1878–1959), Dutch rower
Geert Lovink (born 1959), Dutch media theorist
Geert Mak (born 1946), Dutch journalist and historian
Geert Meijer (born 1951), Dutch football manager
Geert Omloop (born 1974), Belgian cyclist 
Geert Pijnenburg (1896–1980), Belgian writer
Geert Reuten (born 1946), Dutch economist and politician
Geert Arend Roorda (born 1988), Dutch football player
Geert Rouwenhorst, Dutch-born American economist
Geert van Beijeren (1933–2005), Dutch art dealer
Geert Van Bondt (born 1970), Belgian cyclist
Geert Van Calster (born 1970), Belgian lawyer
Geert Van de Walle (1964–1988), Belgian cyclist
Geert Jan van Gelder (born 1947), Dutch academic
Geert van Turnhout (1520–1580), Flemish composer 
Geert van Wou (1440–1527), Dutch bell maker
Geert Versnick (born 1956), Belgian politician
Geert Wilders (born 1963), Dutch politician

Fictional characters
 Geert, in August Bournonville's comic ballet The Kermesse in Bruges

See also
Gert

Dutch masculine given names
Given names
Hypocorisms